South Woodbury is an unincorporated community in Morrow County, in the U.S. state of Ohio.

History
South Woodbury was laid out around 1830 by Daniel Wood, and named for him.

References

Unincorporated communities in Morrow County, Ohio
1830 establishments in Ohio
Populated places established in 1830
Unincorporated communities in Ohio